Woody debris may refer to:

 Slash (logging), coarse and fine woody debris generated during logging operations or through natural forest disturbances
 Coarse woody debris, fallen dead trees and the remains of large branches on the ground in forests
 Large woody debris, logs, branches, and other wood that falls into streams and rivers
 Log jam, an accumulation of large woody debris that can span an entire stream or river channel

See also
 Dead wood (disambiguation)
 Debris